, often abbreviated as , is a seinen manga magazine published by Shogakukan. Like many other manga magazines, it is an "anthology magazine", with each issue featuring new chapters of several manga series. The series are also published in tankōbon form under the Sunday GX Comics imprint.

Monthly magazine
The magazine's title, Monthly Sunday Gene-X, refers to its mission as a manga magazine for Generation X. The first issue was published on July 19, 2000 and new issues are published on the 19th day of each month — not necessarily on a Sunday. The title uses the word "Sunday" more as a trademark or genre name, shared with its sister magazines Weekly Shōnen Sunday and Weekly Young Sunday.

Sunday GX comics books
Shogakukan also publishes manga series previously featured in Sunday GX as paperback tankōbon (compilation volumes) under the imprint Sunday GX Comics.

Series

Notes

References

External links
  
 

2000 establishments in Japan
Magazines established in 2000
Monthly manga magazines published in Japan
Seinen manga magazines
Shogakukan magazines